The Zoka-ol-Molk I is a painting by the Iranian realism painter Kamal-ol-molk with oil on cotton duck. It was painted in 1913 and features portrait of  Mohammad Hossein Foroughi titled Zoka-ol-Molk I father of Mohammad Ali Foroughi titled  Zoka-ol-Molk II.

Sources
 commons.wikimedia.org

Paintings by Kamal-ol-molk
1913 paintings
Modern paintings